Muhaksan is a mountain in southern South Korea, lying in Changwon with a peak reaching  above sea level.

See also
List of mountains in Korea

References

Mountains of South Korea
Mountains of South Gyeongsang Province